Rishi Vohra is a novelist of Indian origin, known for his novels Diary of an Angry Young Man, I am M-M-Mumbai, HiFi in Bollywood and Once Upon the Tracks of Mumbai.

Early life
Rishi Vohra grew up in Mumbai, Maharashtra. He completed his schooling at Bombay Scottish School and junior college at Jai Hind College. After his HSC, he went to the U.S. for higher studies and completed a B.S. degree in Corporate Finance from Arizona State University in Tempe, Arizona and an Associate of Arts degree in Film from Scottsdale Community College in Scottsdale, Arizona. After working in the entertainment industry for several years, he proceeded back to the U.S. and completed an MBA in Sustainability from San Francisco State University in San Francisco, California and a Masters Diploma in Environmental Law from World Wildlife Fund. He is also a Certified Specialist of Wine from the Society of Wine Educators, United States.

Career

AdFilm Production
After completing his bachelor's degree from Arizona State University, Rishi moved back to Mumbai and started his career in Ad Filmmaking under Prahlad Kakkar. During that time, he worked on several renowned campaigns such as Brooke Bond, Maggi, and Rexona.

Feature films
From Ad Filmmaking, he moved onto feature films and worked as an assistant director under filmmakers Sohail Khan and Shimit Amin. He worked on films Pyaar Kiya To Darna Kya, Hello Brother, Maine Dil Tujhko Diya and Ab Tak Chhappan.

Television
While working for Sohail Khan, he directed a television show, Chehre Pe Chehra. He has also worked as a producer for Sony Entertainment Television (India).

Music videos
He directed the music video of the song "Kya Yehi Pyaar Hai" sung by Kamaal Khan and the promotional video of the song "Aaja Nindiya" composed by Sangeet-Siddharth and featured in Aatma.

Live events
He has directed star shows and live events.

Wine
Rishi Vohra is a Certified Specialist of Wine (CSW) and currently writes for delWine.

Filmography
Pyaar Kiya To Darna Kya
Hello Brother
Maine Dil Tujhko Diya (2002)
Ab Tak Chhappan (2004)

Novels
Once Upon the Tracks of Mumbai (2012) - Jaico Publishing House
HiFi in Bollywood (2015) - Jaico Publishing House
Short story "The Mysterious Couple," in the anthology Something Happened on the Way to Heaven (2014) by Sudha Murthy - Penguin Books
I am M-M-Mumbai (2018) - 
Short story "Kaala Baba," in the anthology City of Screams (2019) by Neil D'Silva - Half Baked Beans
Diary of an Angry Young Man (2021) -

Book awards
Once Upon the Tracks of Mumbai was long listed for the Crossword Book Award (2013) and awarded an Honorable Mention at the Hollywood Book Festival in Los Angeles, California.

Affiliations
Indo-Italian Chamber of Commerce and Industry (IICCI) – Alfiere Italico – Wine Cultore (Italy)
Film Writers Association
Society of Wine Educators, USA – Certified Specialist of Wine (CSW)
Indian Wine Academy
Bombay Judo Club (Black Belt – National Judo Federation of India)
Net Impact
Sigma Pi

See also
 List of Indian writers

References

Year of birth missing (living people)
Living people
Arizona State University alumni
Indian male novelists
Jai Hind College alumni
Scottsdale Community College alumni
Novelists from Maharashtra
People from Mumbai
San Francisco State University alumni